India's Best Dancer is an Indian Hindi-language television reality dance show of the India's Best Dancer franchise which airs on Sony Entertainment Television and also available through SonyLIV OTT platforms in India. The show was first developed by Frames Production in the India. Over 2 years, the show has rolled out two seasons.

The shooting of Season 1 was halted due to the COVID-19 pandemic in India and shooting started on 13 July 2020 and broadcasts have started from 18 July 2020. Tiger Pop was the winner of Season 1. Online auditions for season 2 began on 5 May 2021 on SonyLIV. The season 2 aired on 16 October 2021.

Series overview

Judges and hosts

Note: Nora Fatehi replaced Malaika Arora as a judge for some episodes when Arora was unable to join the shoots during Season 1.

Seasons

Season 1

India's Best Dancer 1 first season was premiered on 29 February 2020 on Sony Entertainment Television and Sony Entertainment Television Asia. This season was judged by Geeta Kapoor, Terence Lewis and 	Malaika Arora and hosted by Haarsh Limbachiyaa and Bharti Singh. The Grand Finale was aired on 22 November 2020 and winner was Tiger Pop.

Season 2

India's Best Dancer 2 also known as India's Best Dancer: Best Ka Next Avatar is the second season and It premiered on 16 October 2021 on Sony Entertainment Television. This season judged by Geeta Kapoor, Terence Lewis and 	Malaika Arora for the second time and hosted by Manish Paul. The Grand Finale was aired on 9 January 2022 and Saumya Kamble was declared as the winner.

Contestants details

References

External links 
 India's Best Dancer on Sony Liv

Dance competition television shows
India's Best Dancer